

Administrative and municipal divisions

References

Sakhalin Oblast
Sakhalin Oblast